Adair County is the name of four counties in the United States:

Adair County, Iowa
Adair County, Kentucky 
Adair County, Missouri
Adair County, Oklahoma

United States county name disambiguation pages